Kiesler is a surname. People with the surname include:

 Brigitte Kiesler (1924–2013), German gymnast
 Charles Kiesler (1934–2002), American psychologist and university administrator
 Frederick John Kiesler (1890–1965), Austrian-American architect
 Kenneth Kiesler (born 1953), American symphony orchestra and opera conductor
 Sara Kiesler, computer scientist
 Hedy Lamarr (1914–2000), Austrian-born American film actress and inventor, born Hedwig Eva Maria Kiesler

See also
 Kesler
 Keisler
 Kieler (disambiguation)
 Kieser
 Katrin Kieseler, German-born Australian sprint canoer